The Point Skyhawks football program represents Point University in college football. They are football-only members of the Mid-South Conference and compete at the National Association of Intercollegiate Athletics (NAIA) level.

References

External links
 

 
American football teams established in 2012
2012 establishments in Georgia (U.S. state)